Oak Bank School is a co-educational special school with academy status located in Leighton Buzzard, Bedfordshire, England. The school accepts pupils from all over the Central Bedfordshire area.

Oak Bank was established in 1976 as school for 'mal-adjusted children', and originally had capacity for 40 boarding pupils and 20 day pupils. The school had been commissioned by Luton County Borough, specifically for children from Luton, however Bedfordshire County Council took over responsibility for completing the school after the Local Government Act 1972, and the school accepted children from all over the county of Bedfordshire from its opening. Central Bedfordshire Council took over responsibility for the school after the 2009 structural changes to local government in England. In November 2013 the school converted to academy status.

Today, Oak Bank is a day school for pupils who have statements of special educational need associated with behavioural, emotional and social difficulties. When pupils join the school they have frequently had fractured experiences of education, and so their attainment on entry is well below average.

References

External links
Oak Bank School homepage
 History of Oak Bank School

Special schools in Central Bedfordshire District
Educational institutions established in 1976
1976 establishments in England
Academies in Central Bedfordshire District
Leighton Buzzard